The Runhappy Stakes is a Grade III American Thoroughbred horse race for four years old or older at a distance of six furlongs on the dirt run annually in early May at Belmont Park in Elmont, New York.  The event currently offers a purse of $150,000.

History

The event was inaugurated on 14 May 2014 as the Diablo Stakes and was won by the favorite Sensational Slam who defeated four other runners in a time of 1:09.07. The event was marred by the disqualification of the second place finisher Green Grotto who was placed third and Royal Currier installed in second for interference  mile from the finishing post.  The event was named after the versatile sprinter Diablo who won the 1991 Grade II True North Handicap and the 1992 Grade III Finger Lakes Budweiser Breeders' Cup. 

In 2018 the event was renamed to the Runhappy Stakes in honor of the 2015 US Champion Sprint Horse Runhappy.

The event was upgraded to Grade III in 2020 but was not held due to the COVID-19 pandemic in the United States. Belmont Park ran a shortened meeting and the event was cancelled in favor of the rescheduled Carter Handicap being moved from Aqueduct Racetrack.

Records
Speed record:
6 furlongs – 1:08.12    	Firenze Fire  (2019) 

Margins:
 lengths –  Firenze Fire  (2019) 

Most wins:
 2 – Stallwalkin' Dude (2015, 2017)
 2 – Firenze Fire (2019, 2021)

Most wins by a jockey:
 2 – Irad Ortiz Jr. (2019, 2021)

Most wins by a trainer:
 2 – David Jacobson  (2015, 2017)

Most wins by an owner:
 2 – David Jacobson  (2015, 2017)
 2 – Mr. Amore Stable  (2019, 2021)

Winners

See also
List of American and Canadian Graded races

References 

Graded stakes races in the United States
Grade 3 stakes races in the United States
Recurring sporting events established in 2014
Horse races in New York (state)
2014 establishments in New York (state)
Belmont Park
Open sprint category horse races